KJUA (1380 AM) was a radio station broadcasting a Classic Hip-Hop format. Licensed to Cheyenne, Wyoming, United States, the station was owned by La Familia Broadcasting, LLC.

History

KJUA was first licensed in 1952 as KVWO on 1370 kHz. The station was assigned the KSHY call sign on June 9, 1978.

In 1988, a year after KGAB in Cheyenne moved from 1530 to 650 kHz, KSHY was issued a Construction Permit to move to the vacated frequency, which included a change in its community of license to Fox Farm, Wyoming. On September 16, 1996, KSHY changed its call sign to KJJL.

Expanded Band assignment

On March 17, 1997, the Federal Communications Commission (FCC) announced that eighty-eight stations had been given permission to move to newly available "Expanded Band" transmitting frequencies, ranging from 1610 to 1700 kHz. This authorized KJJL to modify its not-yet-built Construction Permit for a relocation to Fox Farm on 1530 kHz to instead change to 1630 kHz.

A construction permit for the expanded band station on 1630 kHz was assigned the call letters KKWY (now KFBU) on November 21, 1997. The FCC's initial policy was that both the original station and its expanded band counterpart could operate simultaneously for up to five years, after which owners would have to turn in one of the two licenses, depending on whether they preferred the new assignment or elected to remain on the original frequency, although this deadline was extended multiple times.

Later history

In 2002 KJJL made an arrangement to move from 1370 to 1380 kHz, in order to allow KHNC on 1360 kHz in Johnstown, Colorado to increase power. On April 10, 2005, KJJL changed its call sign to KJUA.

KJUA submitted its license for cancellation on January 2, 2018, and FCC cancelled the license and deleted the KJUA call sign from the FCC database on March 18, 2019.

References

External links
FCC Station Search Details: DKJUA (Facility ID: 54740)
FCC History Cards for DKJUA (covering 1950-1980 as KVWO / KSHY)

JUA
Radio stations established in 1952
Classic hip hop radio stations in the United States
2019 disestablishments in Wyoming
1952 establishments in Wyoming
Defunct radio stations in the United States
Radio stations disestablished in 2019
JUA